The National Union of Independent Trade Unions of Togo (UNSIT) is a national trade union center in Togo. It is affiliated with the International Trade Union Confederation.

References

Trade unions in Togo
International Trade Union Confederation